The Antonian Order of Saint Ormizda of the Chaldeans (abbreviated OAOC) is a Chaldean Catholic monastic order of pontifical right for men.

The monastic order was founded in 1808. Its headquarters is in Saint-Antony convent, Baghdad, Al-Duorah province, Iraq.

In 2018, it had 6 houses with 17 members including 15 priests.

Superiors general 
Archimandrite Denha Hanna Touma, O.A.O.C. (? – 2013.07.11)
Fr. Waheed K. Gabriele Tooma, O.A.O.C. (2013 – 2014)
Fr. Joseph Abdel Sater, O.A.O.C. (2014 – 2016)
Fr. Samer Soreshow Yohanna, O.A.O.C. ( 2016–present)

Prelates from their ranks 
 Deceased, with year of death
 1915 : Philip Yaʿqob Abrahamo, Bishop of Gazireh of the Chaldeans (Turkish Kurdistan)
 2006 : Abbot Yousif Ibrahim, Apostolic Administrator emeritus of Sulaimaniya of the Chaldeans (Iraq)
 2013: Archimandrite Denha Hanna Touma, Apostolic Administrator emeritus of Sulaimaniya of the Chaldeans (Iraq)

References

External links 

 http://www.gcatholic.org/orders/150.htm

Eastern Catholic orders and societies
Chaldean Catholic Church